Manaji Rao Scindia, popularly known as Manaji Phakade, was the fifth Maharaja of Gwalior State from 1764 to 1768. He became Maharaja of Gwalior after the abdication of Kadarji Rao Scindia.

He was the grandson of Sardar Sabaji Scindia. He was recognised by the Peshwa as the Sardar of the Scindias on 10 July 1764 for a period of four years before abdicating in favour of Mahadaji Scindia on 18 January 1768. He continued to serve in the Scindia army till his death in year 1800.

References

External links

Scindia dynasty of Gwalior
1777 deaths
Year of birth unknown